The Häme constituency (Finnish: Hämeen vaalipiiri, Swedish: Tavastlands valkrets) is a Finnish constituency represented in the Parliament of Finland. It covers the administrative regions of Tavastia Proper and Päijänne Tavastia, with a combined population of about 364,000. Häme currently elects 14 members to parliament.

The constituency is largely urban, centred on the cities of Hämeenlinna and Lahti. The largest party in the 2011 election was the Social Democratic Party of Finland.

Members of parliament

Members of parliament 2019-2023

Finlands Socialdemokratiska Parti (4)
Ville Skinnari
Tarja Filatov
Johannes Koskinen
Mika Kari

Sannfinländarna (3)
Lulu Ranne
Rami Lehto
Jari Ronkainen

Samlingspartiet (3)
Sanni Grahn-Laasonen
Kalle Jokinen
Timo Heinonen

Centern i Finland (1)
Hilkka Kemppi

Gröna förbundet (1)
Mirka Soinikoski

Vänsterförbundet (1)
Aino-Kaisa Pekonen

Kristdemokraterna i Finland (1)
Päivi Räsänen

2011

In official statistics of Finland the parliamentary elections are always compared with both the previous parliamentary elections and municipal elections. The municipal elections will be held in 2012. In Tavastia electoral district Kanta-Häme wins more parliamentary seats than Päijät-Häme as 1/4 of the votes for the candidates from Kanta-Häme is achieved from Päijät-Häme. As for the Centre Party this has been due to the expertise of the agricultural policies affecting the agrarian surroundings of the city of Lahti and as for the Social Democratic Party of Finland hard campaigning in Lahti and on its surroundings from Kanta-Häme. Both of the regions compete with each other's in the front of the state.

National Coalition Party
Timo Heinonen, Loppi, 6 533 votes
Sanni Grahn-Laasonen, Forssa, 5 866 votes
Kalle Jokinen, Orimattila, 5 277 votes
 vice member of the parliament: Ilkka Viljanen, Lahti, 4 794 votes, Ilkka Viljanen was a member of the parliament 2007–2011. Mrs Tuija Nurmi did not succeed in re-election.

Social Democratic Party of Finland
Johannes Koskinen, Hämeenlinna, 7 710 votes
Tarja Filatov, Hämeenlinna, 6 780 votes
Mika Kari, Lahti, 5 269 votes
Jouko Skinnari, Lahti, 5 185 votes
vice member of the parliament: Iisakki Kiemunki, 5 164 votes

Centre Party
Sirkka-Liisa Anttila, Forssa, 5 881 votes
Juha Rehula, Hollola, 5 574 votes
vice member of the parliament: Mika Penttilä, 4 535 votes, the member of the parliament, Mr. Risto Autio did not succeed in re-election.

Left Alliance
Aino-Kaisa Pekonen, Riihimäki, 4 009 votes
vice member of the parliament: Antti Holopainen, 2 722 votes

Christian Democrats
Päivi Räsänen,  Riihimäki, 7 003 votes
vice member of the parliament: Marjo Loponen, Lahti, 1 862 votes

True Finns
Anne Louhelainen, Hollola, 6 157 votes
James Hirvisaari, Asikkala, 5 530 votes
Ismo Soukola, Hämeenlinna, 5 053 votes
vice member of the parliament: Rami Lehto, Lahti, 4 761 votes

Percentage of the electorate in municipalities (votes)

Orimattila, 28,8%
Nastola, 27,9%
Hollola, 26,9%
Asikkala, 26,8%
Kärkölä, 24,9%
Padasjoki, 23,2%
Hämeenkoski, 23,1%

Loppi, 21,6%
Lahti, 21,3%
Hausjärvi, 20,9%
Hattula, 20,2%
Janakkala, 19,6%
Hartola, 17,8%
Riihimäki, 17,8%

Forssa, 17,7%
Heinola, 17,7%
Jokioinen, 17,7%
Sysmä, 17,6%
Humppila, 17,3%
Hämeenlinna, 17,2%
Ypäjä, 17,0%
Tammela, 16,2%

Current members of parliament 2007–2011
 Sirkka-Liisa Anttila (Kesk.)
 Risto Autio (Kesk.)
 Tarja Filatov (SDP)
 Timo Heinonen (Kok.)
 Matti Kauppila (Vas)
 Jari Koskinen (Kok.)
 Johannes Koskinen (SDP)
 Tuija Nurmi (Kok.)
 Kirsi Ojansuu (Vihr.)
 Juha Rehula (Kesk.)
 Päivi Räsänen (KD)
 Jouko Skinnari (SDP)
 Satu Taiveaho (SDP)
 Ilkka Viljanen (Kok.)
 KD = Christian Democrats
 Kesk. = Centre
 Kok. = National Coalition
 SDP = Social Democrats
 Vihr. = Greens

Old election results

|}

See also
 Constituencies of Finland

References

Parliament of Finland electoral districts
Kanta-Häme
Päijät-Häme